Edoardo Affini (born 24 June 1996 in Mantua) is an Italian cyclist, who currently rides for UCI WorldTeam . In October 2020, he was named in the startlist for the 2020 Giro d'Italia.

Major results

2013
 4th Time trial, National Junior Road Championships 
2014
 1st  Road race, UEC European Junior Road Championships
 1st Trofeo San Rocco
 1st Trofeo Buffoni
 2nd Time trial, National Junior Road Championships
 4th Road race, UCI Junior Road World Championships
 4th Gran Premio Sportivi di Sovilla
 7th Overall Le Trophée Centre Morbihan 
 9th Trofeo Dorigo Porte
2015
 3rd Time trial, National Under-23 Road Championships
 5th Time trial, UEC European Under-23 Road Championships
2016
 10th GP Capodarco
2017
 4th Time trial, UEC European Under-23 Road Championships
 6th Overall Olympia's Tour
 8th Time trial, UCI Road World Under-23 Championships
2018
 1st  Time trial, UEC European Under-23 Road Championships
 1st  Time trial, Mediterranean Games
 National Under-23 Road Championships
1st  Road race
1st  Time trial
 1st Prologue Giro Ciclistico d'Italia
 4th Time trial, UCI Road World Under-23 Championships
 4th Overall Olympia's Tour
2019
 1st Stage 6 (ITT) Tour of Britain
 UEC European Road Championships
3rd  Time trial
3rd  Team relay
 4th Time trial, National Road Championships
 4th Overall Tour of Norway
1st Stage 4
2020
 1st Stage 1 (TTT) Czech Cycling Tour
 UEC European Road Championships
3rd  Team relay
5th Time trial
2021
 2nd Time trial, National Road Championships
 UCI Road World Championships
3rd  Team relay
9th Time trial
 6th Time trial, UEC European Road Championships
2022
 Vuelta a España
1st Stage 1 (TTT)
Held  after Stage 3
 2nd  Team relay, UCI Road World Championships
 3rd Time trial, National Road Championships
2023
 1st Stage 3 (TTT) Paris–Nice

Grand Tour general classification results timeline
Sources:

References

External links

1996 births
Living people
Italian male cyclists
Sportspeople from Mantua
Mediterranean Games gold medalists for Italy
Mediterranean Games medalists in cycling
Competitors at the 2018 Mediterranean Games
Cyclists from the Province of Mantua
20th-century Italian people
21st-century Italian people